KRXO (1270 kHz) is a commercial AM radio station licensed to Claremore, Oklahoma, and serves the Tulsa metropolitan area. KRXO is owned by Ty and Tony Tyler, through licensee Tyler Media, LLC. It airs a Spanish CHR radio format. It was previously Simulcast from co-owned KRXO-FM in Oklahoma City, with NBC Sports Radio programming late nights and weekends. Programming on KRXO is also broadcast on FM translator stations K300CY at 107.9 MHz and K245BZ at 96.9 MHz The transmitter is off South 4100 Road in Claremore.

KRXO transmits with a directional signal around the clock, at 5,000 watts in the daytime and 1,000 watts at night. The day signal is maximized to send a 13,000 watt ERP lobe up and down Interstate 44.

History
The station originated as KWPR on January 17, 1958. The call sign was a tribute to famous Oklahoman Will Rogers.  It began as a 500-watt daytimer, required to sign off at night to avoid interfering with other stations on AM 1270. In 1959, the station was acquired by BRT Broadcasting.

On September 16, 2015, the then-KTUZ dropped its Spanish language format and picked up the sports talk format from sister station KRXO-FM in Oklahoma City. The station changed its call sign to KRXO on October 5, 2015.

On June 15, 2020, KRXO dropped its simulcast with KRXO-FM and changed its format from sports to Spanish CHR, branded as "Ritmo 107.9".

Translators

Previous logo

External links

References

RXO
Radio stations established in 1958
1958 establishments in Oklahoma
Contemporary hit radio stations in the United States
RXO (AM)